This is a list of all of the known Imperial Villages, the smallest immediate constituents of the Holy Roman Empire.

A

B
Billigheim
Birkweiler
Bubenheim (part of the Ingelheim Grant)
Burgholzhausen vor der Höhe

C

D
Dangolsheim
Daxweiler (part of the Ingelheim Grant)
Dexheim

E
Eglofs
Elsheim (part of the Ingelheim Grant)
Erlenbach
Eschbach

F
Freisbach
Frei-Weinheim (part of the Ingelheim Grant)

G
Gebsattel
Ginsheim-Gustavsburg
Geboltsheim (Reichsweiler or Imperial Hamlet)
Gochsheim
Gommersheim
Gotramstein
Grassendorf
Grosswinternheim (part of the Ingelheim Grant)
Gunstett

H
Hochstett
Hohenstaufen
Holzhausen
Horrheim
Huttendorf

I
Impflingen
Ingelheim Grant (Ingelheimer Grund)

J

K
Kallstadt
Keffendorf (Reichsweiler or Imperial Hamlet)
Kindwiller
Klingen
Kreuznach
Kriegsheim
Küttolsheim

L
The Free Men of the Leutkircher Heath
Lixhausen

M
Melbach
Minversheim
Mittelschäffolsheim
Mommenheim
Möntenich
Morschweiler
Mutzenhausen

N
Nieder-Ingelheim (part of the Ingelheim Grant)
Niederschäffolsheim
Nierstein

O
Oberdachstetten
Ockstadt
Ober-Ingelheim (part of the Ingelheim Grant)
Ohlungen

P
Pfändhausen

Q

R
The Reichstal of the Harmersbach
Ringeldorf
Rohrbach
Rottelsheim
Rumersheim (Reichsweiler or Imperial hamlet)

S
Schwabenheim an der Selz (part of the Ingelheim Grant)
Scherlenheim
Sennfeld
Soden
Stadecken-Elsheim
Steinweiler
Sufflenheim
Sulzbach
Surburg

T

U
Überach

V

W
Wackernheim (part of the Ingelheim Grant)
Wahlenheim
Walk
Wiesbach
Wingersheim
Wintershausen
Wittersheim

X

Y

Z

References

 List
Lists of states in the Holy Roman Empire